Hot d'Or was an adult film industry pornographic award, awarded annually from 1992 to 2001 in Cannes, France by the French trade journal Hot Vidéo.

Overview
The awards have been described as the porn equivalent of the Palme d'Or or the Academy Awards. The analogous American honor is the AVN Award. The inaugural event was held over two weeks in May in a hotel complex, at exactly the same time as the Cannes Film Festival. Venues included the Royal Casino Hotel, situated five miles from the Croisette. In 1997, the event was held at the Lido in Paris.

The Hot d'Or was noted for the lavish parties that accompanied it, particularly those held by Private Media Group on board a yacht in Cannes marina. The event attracted many performers, paparazzi, directors, and producers and distributors who would make deals buying and selling films. The event would often court publicity by having porn stars pose naked on the public beach. Consequently, it attracted attention from international media who were in town for the mainstream festival.

The highest award given was the Hot d'Or d'honneur, which was awarded to figures including Estelle Desanges, Marc Dorcel, Julia Channel, John Stagliano, Internet Entertainment Group and Ona Zee.

20th anniversary
After an eight-year absence, the awards returned to Paris on October 20, 2009 to commemorate the 20th anniversary of Hot Vidéo magazine. They were held at Salle Wagram at the art deco Radisson Hotel, and French pop star Helmut Fritz performed at the show. French television giant Canal Plus had the rights to broadcast the show during their late-night block of adult programming.

Reception and review
Hot d'Ors presence was not particularly welcomed by the Cannes Film Festival or Cannes city officials. In 1998 (when the awards were again held in Cannes), Steve Vlottes of Wicked Pictures said the awards were: "the most important show that we attend".

Award history
1st Annual Hot d'Or (1992)

Best Foreign Actress: Zara Whites - Rêves de cuir
Best French Actress: Carole Tennessy
Best American Actress: Ashlyn Gere
Best European Actor: Christoph Clark - Le clown by Nils Molitor
Best Foreign Director: John Leslie
Best Foreign Film: La Chatte 2

2nd Annual Hot d'Or (1993)

Best European Actress: Angelica Bella (Hungary)
Best European Starlet: Tabatha Cash
Best European Director: Michel Ricaud
Best European Film: Arabica
Best Original Screenplay: L'Affaire Savannah by Vidéo Marc Dorcel

3rd Annual Hot d'Or (1994)

Best European Actress: Tabatha Cash (France)
Best European Starlet: Valy Verdi
Best European Actor: Christophe Clark - Délit de Séduction by Michel Ricaud
Best European Director: Michel Ricaud
Hot d'Or d'honneur: Zara Whites
Best European Film: Délit de Séduction by Vidéo Marc Dorcel
Best Original Screenplay: Photographic Modelling by Xavier Bonastre

4th Annual Hot d'Or (1995)

Best European Actress: Draghixa (France) - Le Parfum de Mathilde
Best European Starlet: Barbara Doll
Best French Actress: Coralie
Best American Actress: Ashlyn Gere
Best American Starlet: Chasey Lain
Best European Actor: Christophe Clark - Citizen Shane by Michel Ricaud with Anita Rinaldi
Best New Director: Rocco Siffredi
Best European Director: Marc Dorcel
Best European Film: Citizen Shane by Vidéo Marc Dorcel
Best Original Screenplay: Le Parfum de Mathilde by Vidéo Marc Dorcel
Best Amateur Series: L'École de Laetitia

5th Annual Hot d'Or (1996)

Best European Actress: Coralie
Best European Supporting Actress: Élodie Chérie
Best European Starlet: Laure Sinclair
Best American Actress: Jenna Jameson
Best American Starlet: Jenna Jameson
Best European Actor: Rocco Siffredi
Best American Actor: Marc Davis
Best New Actor: David Perry
Best European Director: Marc Dorcel (The Princess and The Whore)
Best American Director: Michael Ninn (Latex)
Best New Director: Christoph Clark (Young Widows Lustful)
Hot d'Or d'honneur: Richard Allan
Best European Film: La Princesse et La Pute (The Princess and The Whore - Marc Dorcel)
Best American Film: Latex (Michael Ninn)
Best First French Production: Blue Mask
Best Lesbian Film: Les Chiennes (The Bitches)
Best Original Screenplay: Gigolo
Best Cover: Le Désir Dans La Peau (Desire In The Skin)
Best Remake or Adaptation: La Princesse et La Pute (The Princess and The Whore - Marc Dorcel)
Best American Pro-am Series - Buttman
Best French Pro-Am Series - School of Laetitia
Best Gold AVN American Film - Buttman's European Vacation 3
Hot Platinum K7 - Latex

6th Annual Hot d'Or (1997)

Best European Actress: Laure Sainclair
Best European Supporting Actress: Olivia Del Rio (La Ruée vers Laure)
Best European Starlet: Nikki Anderson (Sweet Lady)
Best American Actress: Jenna Jameson
Best American Starlet: Kobe Tai
Best European Actor: Rocco Siffredi
Best Supporting European Actor: Richard Langin
Best American Actor: Vince Vouyer
Best New Actor: Philippe Dean
Best European Director: Pierre Woodman (The Pyramid)
Best American Director: Michael Ninn (Body Shock)
Best New American Director: Kris Kramski (Sexhibition)
Best European Film: The Pyramid (Private - Pierre Woodman)
Best American Film: Conquest
Best French Film  - Middle Budget: The Magnifix
Best Original Screenplay: The Pyramid
Best Cover: The Pyramid
Best Pro-Am French Series: Les Infirmières de Laetitia (The Laetitia Nurses)
Best Pro-Am American Series: Venom
Best Screenplay - Adaptation or Remake: Cape Town
Platinum Movie 1997: The Fugitive (Private - Pierre Woodman)
AVN d'Or for Best American Film: Ben Dover's Fresh Cheeks

7th Annual Hot d'Or (1998)

Best European Actress: Laure Sainclair (Les Nuits de la Presidente - Video Marc Dorcel)
Best European Supporting Actress: Coralie
Best European Starlet: Jade
Best American Actress: Jenna Jameson (Sexe de Feu, Coeur de Glace - Wicked Pictures)
Best American Starlet: Stacy Valentine
Best European Actor: Roberto Malone
Best European Supporting Actor: Andrew Youngman
Best American Actor: Mark Davis (Decadence - Michael Ninn)
Best New Actor: Ramon
Best European Director: Pierre Woodman
Best New European Director: Anita Rinaldi
Best American Director: Kris Kramski
Best New American Director: Philip Mond (Zazel)
Best European Film: Tatiana (Private)
Best American Film: Lisa (Sin City)
Best French Film: Bad Boy
Best Original Screenplay: Tatiana
Best Remake or Adaptation: La Belle et la Bête
Best Box Cover: Paris Chic (Andrew Blake)
Best American Pro-Am Series: World Sex Tour (Anabolic)
Best French Pro-Am Series: L’école de Laetitia
Hot d'Or d'honneurs: Marc Dorcel, Julia Channel, John Stagliano, and Internet Entertainment Group (for the release of The Pamela Anderson Home Video or Pam & Tommy Lee - Hardcore & Uncensored)

8th Annual Hot d'Or (1999)

Best American Actress: Jill Kelly (Exile)
Best European Actress: Nikki Anderson (L'Enjeu Du Desir and Rocco Never Dies)
Best European Supporting Actress: Dolly Golden
Best American Starlet: Jewel De'Nyle
Best European Starlet: Kate More
Best American Actor: Mark Davis
Best European Actor: David Perry (L'Enjeu Du Desir)
Best European Supporting Actor: Marc Barrow (Croupe Du Monde)
Best New Actor: Ian Scott
Best European Movie: L'Enjeu Du Desir
Best American Movie: Flashpoint
Best All-Sex Film: Planet Sexxx 2
Best French Pro-Am Series: Hongrie Interdite
Best American Pro-Am series: The Voyeur
Best American Director: Michael Ninn
Best European Director: Alain Payet (Le Labyrinthe)
Best New European Director: Fred Coppula (Niqueurs Nes)
Best New American Director: Gary Sage (Carnal Obsessions)
Best Screenplay: Alain Payet
Best Box Cover: L'Enjeu Du Desir

9th Annual Hot d'Or (2000)

Best Boxcover: L'Esclave des sens - VMD
Best Screenplay: L'Emmerdeuse - Fred Coppula, Blue One 
Best Remake or Adaptation: Les Tontons Tringleurs (Alain Payet - Blue One)
Best American Starlet: Tera Patrick 
Best European Starlet: Meridian
Best French Starlet: Estelle Desanges
Best American Actress: Stacy Valentine
Best European Actress: Laura Angel
Best French Actress: Dolly Golden
Best European Supporting Actor: Marc Barrow, Hotdorix Colmax 
Best European Supporting Actress: Sylvia Saint (Le Contrat des Anges - Video Marc Dorcel)
Best American Pro-Am Series: The Voyeur - VMD 
Best European Pro-Am Series: Euro Anal - Maeva 
Best French Amateur Series: Le Fantasmotron - Luxor 
Best American Actor: Randy Spears, DMJ 6 Blue One 
Best European Actor: Ian Scott - L'Emmerdeuse Dolly Golden, Les Tontons Tringleurs Blue One 
Hot d'Or d'honneur: Ona Zee 
Best European New Director: Gabriel Zéro - La Verité si tu bandes!, Lucy 
Best American Director: Michael Ninn, Ritual Blue One 
Best European Director: Fred Coppula - L'Emmerdeuse, Blue One 
AVN d'Or - Best European Release in the US: Then Rocco Meats Kelly 2 - Rocco Siffredi & Evil Angel
Best DVD: La Ruée Vers Laure - VMD 
Platinum Movie (Editors' Choice): Machos - Blue One 
Best French Movie: Middle Budget La Soirée des Connes Patrice Cabanel, JTC 
Best American Movie: Ritual - Michael Ninn, Blue One 
Best European Movie: L'Emmerdeuse - Fred Coppula, Blue One

10th Annual Hot d'Or (2001)

Award winners:
Best Actress - "vote des professionnels": Océane
Best Actor - "vote des professionnels": Sebastian Barrio
Best European Actress: Daniella Rush (Orgie en noir)
Best European Supporting Actress: Estelle Desanges (Project X)
Best European Starlet: Judith Fox
Best French Actress: Océane (Project X)
Best French Starlet: Clara Morgane
Best American Actress: Tera Patrick (Crossroads)
Best American Starlet: Briana Banks
Best European Supporting Actor: Marc Barrow (Profession: Gros Cul)
Best European Actor: Ian Scott (Max)
Best American Actor: Mark Davis (Justine's Daughter: Nothing to Hide 3)
Best Director: Pierre Woodman (Madness)
Best Director - "vote des professionnels": Fred Coppula (Max)
Best Film: Stavros (Mario Salieri - Colmax)
Best Film - "vote des professionnels": Max (Fred Coppula - Blue One)
Best French Film - Middle Budget: Stavros (Colmax)
Best Original Screenplay: Orgie en noir (Ovidie - VMD)
Best Cover: Madness (Private)
Best Videocassette: Soirée de connes (Patrice Cabanel)
Hot d'Or d'honneur: 
Sharon Mitchell
Paul Fishbein
Ovidie
Thierry Ardisson

Hot d'Or Hall of Fame: Larry Flynt

11th Hot d'Or (2009) for the 20th Anniversary of Hot Video magazine
The complete list of winners follows:

Best French Starlet: Angell Summers
Best European Starlet: Black Angelika
Best American Starlet: Kayden Kross
Best Adult Website: www.sexyavenue.com
Best French Actress: Katsuni (Pirates II: Stagnetti's Revenge - Digital Playground)
Best European Actress: Tarra White (Billionaire - Private)
Best American Actress: Jesse Jane (Pirates II: Stagnetti's Revenge - Digital Playground)
Best French Actor: Sebastian Barrio (Blanche, Alice, Sandy et les autres - Alkrys)
Best American Actor: Evan Stone (Pirates II: Stagnetti's Revenge - Digital Playground)
Best Actress’ Blog: Katsuni - ilovekatsuni.com
Best French Female Performer: Cecilia Vega
Best European Female Performer: Tarra White
Best American Female Performer: Jenna Haze
Best French Director:  John B. Root (Montre-moi du rose - JBR Media)
Best European Director: Alessandro Del Mar (Billionaire - Private)
Best American Director: John Stagliano (Fashionistas Safado Berlin - Evil Angel/Marc Dorcel)
Best French Pro-Am Director: Enola Suger and Al Arash (le Porntour - Swipp)
Best European Gonzo Director: Christoph Clark (Angel Perverse - Evil Angel)
Best American Gonzo Director: Manuel Ferrara (Slutty and Sluttier - VCV/Evil Angel)
Best French Male Performer: Manuel Ferrara
Best European Male Performer: Nacho Vidal
Best American Male Performer: Lexington Steele
Best French Screenplay: Blanche, Alice, Sandy et les autres by Christian Lavil (Alkrys)
Best European Screenplay: Billionaire by Alessandro Del Mar (Private)
Best American Screenplay: Pirates II: Stagnetti's Revenge by Joone (Digital Playground)
Best French Movie: Ritual by Moire Candy/ Max Candy (Marc Dorcel)
Best European Movie: Billionaire by Alessandro Del Mar (Private)
Best American Movie: Pirates II: Stagnetti’s Revenge by Joone (Digital Playground)

Honorary Awards:
Second Sexe
Alpha France
Coralie
Piotr Stanislas
Gérard Kikoïne
Evil Angel
Ovidie and Jack Tyler
Adam & Eve
Estelle Desanges

References

External links
 Official Site (in French)
 Hot d'Or Partial list of recipients at the Internet Movie Database
 Past winners
 2000 Hot D'or Nominations
 2009 nominee list
 2009 award winner list

Pornographic film awards
Cannes
Film festivals in France